Kelwood is a community in the Rural Municipality of Rosedale, Manitoba, Canada.

It has a gas station/restaurant right on the highway called the Barn, there’s an antique store, and a cafe downtown. There is also the Kelwood legion for the after work crowd.  It is north of Neepawa and is home to the Harvest Sun Music Fest.

References

Unincorporated communities in Westman Region